Dana Mohler-Faria was the eleventh president of Bridgewater State University serving from 2002 until his retirement in 2015. and a member of the Massachusetts Board of Elementary and Secondary Education.  He was formerly the Special Advisor for Education to Massachusetts Governor Deval Patrick prior to the creation of a cabinet-level Secretary of Education in 2008.

Personal life
Mohler-Faria received an Associate's degree from Cape Cod Community College, a bachelor’s and Master's degree in history from Boston University, and a Doctor of Education degree higher education administration from the University of Massachusetts Amherst.  He is a veteran of the United States Air Force, serving from 1966 to 1970.  He currently resides with his wife and son in Mashpee, Massachusetts

Professional life
From 1975 to 1984, Mohler-Faria was Director of Financial Aid and the SACHEM Outreach Program at Cape Cod Community College.  Following that post, he served as Assistant Dean of Administrative Services at Bristol Community College until 1987, and then in various leadership positions at Mount Wachusett Community College until 1991.  In 1991 he began his association with Bridgewater State College, serving eleven years as the Vice President for Administration and Finance.  In 2002, he succeeded Adrian Tinsley as President of Bridgewater State College. He stepped down at the end of the 2014-2015 academic year.

According to his biographical sketch on the Commonwealth of Massachusetts' website, Mohler-Faria, in ascending to the presidency of Bridgewater State University, became the "first person of color to lead Bridgewater State College and is only the second Cape Verdean in the United States to be elected the president of a higher education institution."

He is currently a member of the advisory council for the Wampanoag Language Immersion School, a partnership between the Wôpanâak Language Reclamation Project and the Montessori Academy of Cape Cod.

References

External links
 Bridgewater State University: Office of the President

Living people
Year of birth missing (living people)
People from Mashpee, Massachusetts
Boston University College of Arts and Sciences alumni
University of Massachusetts Amherst College of Education alumni
Presidents of the University of Massachusetts system
State cabinet secretaries of Massachusetts
American people of Cape Verdean descent
Bridgewater State University faculty
African-American state cabinet secretaries
African-American people in Massachusetts politics
21st-century African-American people